Goat Simulator 3 is an action video game and the sequel to Goat Simulator. The game was announced during Summer Game Fest and was released on November 17, 2022. The game features a four-player cooperative mode, and it is set on the fictional island of San Angora. The game does not feature cross-platform multiplayer upon release.

Gameplay

Goat Simulator 3, like its predecessor, is an action game played in a third-person perspective where the goal, controlling the goat player character, is to wreak havoc and perform stunts in the game's urban environment. A mechanic of the previous game where the playable goat can hitch themselves to items and objects found in the world by licking them is retained in this game. The developers claim that its open world is 18 times larger than that of the first game. Additionally, sections exist where different gameplay styles are explored, such as a parody of Wolfenstein 3D with first-person shooter mechanics. A story mode, new to the series, also appears in Goat Simulator 3.

A four-player cooperative online multiplayer mode was also added with the ability to play 7 competitive PvP minigames at any time and anywhere during gameplay in the online multiplayer mode and include games such as the floor is lava, Prop Hunt, and an association football-like mini-game titled Hoofball.

Players are also given their own customizable hub world known as the Goat Castle that is upgraded by completing goals and achievements in the other worlds.

Reception 

According to review aggregator Metacritic, Goat Simulator 3 received "mixed or average reviews" for the PC and PlayStation 5 versions, while the Xbox Series X version received "generally favorable reviews".

Notes

References 

2022 video games
Action video games
Windows games
Xbox Series X and Series S games
Video game sequels
Open-world video games
PlayStation 5 games
Video games about animals
Parody video games
Coffee Stain Studios games
Fiction about goats
Video games developed in Sweden
Multiplayer and single-player video games